The 1982 Speedway World Pairs Championship was the thirteenth FIM Speedway World Pairs Championship. The final took place in Sydney, Australia, at the Liverpool City Raceway.

The championship was won by Dennis Sigalos and Bobby Schwartz of the United States, who were undefeated on the night. Peter Collins and Kenny Carter of England finished second, with Hans Nielsen and Ole Olsen of Denmark third. As the host nation, Australia was seeded directly to the Final and were represented by Australian Champion Billy Sanders and Australian championship runner up Gary Guglielmi, both Sydney based riders who were riding on their home track. Australia finished in a disappointing fourth place.

Despite Motorcycle speedway having its origins in Australia as far back as the 1910s, the 1982 World Pairs Final was the first time Australia had held a Speedway World Final. 1982 was also the only time the World Pairs Championship was held outside of England or Europe.

Preliminary round
  Krsko
 May 2

Semifinal 1
  Vojens
 June 5

Semifinal 2
  Prague
 June 5

World final
  Sydney, Liverpool City Raceway
 December 11
 Referee:  Sam Bass

See also
 1982 Individual Speedway World Championship
 1982 Speedway World Team Cup
 motorcycle speedway
 1982 in sports

References

1982
World Pairs